Keith Schmidt (19 December 1921 – 4 October 2017) was an Australian cricketer. He played sixteen first-class matches for Tasmania between 1949 and 1961.

See also
 List of Tasmanian representative cricketers

References

External links
 

1921 births
2017 deaths
Australian cricketers
Tasmania cricketers
Cricketers from Hobart